is a famous children's sitcom, and the first to feature the friendly monster Booska. Produced by Tsuburaya Productions, the show aired on Nippon TV from November 9, 1966 to September 27, 1967, with a total of 47 episodes. There was a Booska revival in Japan from 1998 to 2000, when a new season of Booska was released called "Booska! Booska!" (in English).

Character 
Booska is the name of a cute, friendly, human-sized kaiju that looks like a cross between a bucktoothed teddy bear and a giraffe. It was originally an iguana until its owner and mega-genius, Daisuke Tonda, fed it experimental powder called "kuropara" meant to grow the creature into a giant dinosaur-like monster that Daisuke could control.  Booska himself appeared wearing a "Boo Crown" which is made from the element Booskanium, appearing as three golden horns running from front to back down his head.  This is the source of all his magical abilities, as well as his intelligence, so if he loses the crown he loses his abilities as well.  By using his Boo Crown, Booska can fly, lift up to 100 tons, or even turn invisible, among a number of other powers including shooting lasers and an extendible/retractable tail.  The crown itself is temperature-sensitive, so if it warms up his powers and intelligence strengthen, and if it is cooled they weaken.  He can also change his size, appearing initially as about a foot tall in Episode 1, but switching between that size and the height of an adult human (1.8 m) weighing 120 kg.  Booska needs to be wearing his Boo Crown for his superpowers to work, and his Boo Crown requires nourishment, especially ramen, in order to function properly.  In addition, after a turtle bites his tail in the first episode, Booska becomes terrified of turtles, which his enemies use to their advantage.

Booska has a brother, Chamergon, who Daisuke agrees to create after Booska reveals that he feels lonely.  Daisuke plans on using the same kuropara powder that he used to create Booska on a squirrel, though this plan goes awry when a space alien crashes into the reaction.  As a result, Chamergon is part squirrel, part space alien, and he can survive without oxygen.  Chamergon has superpowers as well, including an ability to shoot lasers from his tail, super-speed, and the ability to shape-shift through use of a walnut.  He is originally Booska's nemesis, but he learns to be better with time, eventually turning into a friend (though never quite losing his tricksy habits).

Production 
Kaiju Booska was originally planned to feature a monster resembling Godzilla.

Home media 
On April 25, 2001 Bandai Visual released a box-set titled Kaiju Booska DVD Memorial BOX and on March 22, 2013 and released a box-set titled Kaiju Booska COMPLETE DVD-BOX.

References

External links 

 

1960s Japanese television series
Tsuburaya Productions
1966 Japanese television series debuts
1967 Japanese television series endings
Japanese television shows featuring puppetry
Tokusatsu television series
Japanese television sitcoms
Nippon TV original programming
Ultra television series